Now That's What I Call Music! #1's is a special edition of the Now! series released in the United States on January 24, 2006. It includes 20 tracks that were released on previous editions of the Now! series.

Now! #1's reached number six on the Billboard 200 albums chart and was certified Gold by the RIAA.

On May 4, 2015, an updated version of the compilation was released, featuring hits from 2006–2015.

Track listing

Charts

Weekly charts

Year-end charts

References

2006 compilation albums
Now That's What I Call Music! albums (American series)